Owen Augustine Wells (February 4, 1844 – January 29, 1935) was a U.S. Representative from Wisconsin.

Born in Catskill, New York, Wells moved with his parents to a farm near Empire, Wisconsin, in 1850.
He attended public and private schools.
He studied law and was admitted to the bar in 1870 and commenced practice in Fond du Lac, Wisconsin.
He also engaged in agricultural pursuits and stock raising.
He was appointed by President Grover Cleveland as collector of internal revenue for the third Wisconsin district in 1885, serving until 1887, when that district was consolidated with the Milwaukee district.
He served as delegate to the Democratic National Convention in 1888 and to the Gold Democratic National Convention in 1896 and also to numerous State conventions of his party.

Wells was elected as a Democrat to the Fifty-third Congress (March 4, 1893 – March 3, 1895). He was elected as the representative of Wisconsin's 6th congressional district.
He was an unsuccessful candidate for reelection in 1894 to the Fifty-fourth Congress.
He declined to accept any public office and resumed the practice of law in Fond du Lac.
He retired in 1901 and resided in Fond du Lac until his death there on January 29, 1935.
He was interred in Rienzi Cemetery.

References

1844 births
1935 deaths
Democratic Party members of the United States House of Representatives from Wisconsin
People from Catskill, New York
People from Fond du Lac, Wisconsin